"Raised on Robbery" is a song written by Joni Mitchell. Joni claimed it was written about the Empire Hotel in Regina, Saskatchewan, still standing on Saskatchewan Drive. It was the lead single from her 1974 album Court and Spark. However, this article from CNN confirms that the Empire Hotel mentioned in the song was actually located in Joni Mitchell's hometown of Saskatoon.

Lyrics and music
The lyrics are about a prostitute who tries to pick up a man sitting alone in a hotel.  The prostitute tells him about her life, until at the end of the song the man leaves.  Los Angeles Times music critic Robert Hilburn explains that although the lyrics are provocative, they are "camouflaged enough" for AM radio, for example by using a cooking metaphor.

"Raised on Robbery" has a strophic structure with a refrain at the end of each verse and a four-line introduction section to describe the setting and characters.  The music is more commercial than much of the music Mitchell performed before releasing this song, and Allmusic critic William Ruhlmann describes it as "an outright rock tune," although retaining the acoustic guitar work that Mitchell was known for.  Robbie Robertson of the Band plays electric guitar on the song to enhance the rock music feel.  Billboard described the guitar playing as "funky" and said that the guitars and horns keep the music flowing.  According to music professor Lloyd Whitesell, Mitchell "employs vocal histrionics to portray" the prostitute and conveys her brash personalities through "a bright, forceful vocal tone and suggestive, flamboyant slides."

Reception
Music critic Sean Nelson regarded "Raised on Robbery" as a tribute to such 1950s rock and roll songs as "Shake Rattle and Roll" and performers such as Chuck Berry but did not think it was very convincing, saying that it sounded "stodgy and wrinkled."  On the other hand, Ruhlmann regarded the song as a perfectly realized "short story in song" with "funny and saucy" lyrics.  Fellow Allmusic critic Jason Ankeny stated that "Raised on Robbery" " offers an acutely funny look at the predatory environment of the singles bar scene."  Hilburn called it the "liveliest track" on Court and Spark, calling it a "surprising, but welcome exercise in humor."  Tallahassee Democrat critic Bud Newman claimed that it was the only song on Court and Spark that "comes right out and grabs you, holding you captive to the lyric and the musical package."  Cash Box said that "a rocking, rolling hard driving effort by Joni is a rarity...but this one was well worth waiting for." Record World said that "Joni goes for a boogie-woogie beat, tight '30s harmonies and great instrumental backup on her spectacular new single entry."

"Raised on Robbery" reached No. 50 on the Cashbox singles chart, No. 65 on the Billboard Hot 100, and No. 40 on the Billboard Adult Contemporary chart.

"Raised on Robbery" was later included on the video version of Mitchell's 1980 live album Shadows and Light, along with her compilation albums Hits (1996) and Songs of a Prairie Girl (2005), the latter album being dedicated to Saskatchewan's centenary celebrations.

Charts

References

Joni Mitchell songs
Songs written by Joni Mitchell
1973 songs
1973 singles
Song recordings produced by Joni Mitchell
Asylum Records singles